The D.I.C.E. Award for Outstanding Achievement in Game Direction is an award presented annually by the Academy of Interactive Arts & Sciences during the academy's annual D.I.C.E. Awards. This recognizes "the individual or small group of individuals who are responsible for directing and driving an interactive game and its team through a combination of skills that include vision, management execution, and game design to create a cohesive experience. This award recognizes the role of the creative director and game director - in guiding all elements of a title and shaping the final outcome of a game."

The most recent winner was Elden Ring, which was developed by FromSoftware and published by Bandai Namco Entertainment.

Winners and nominees

2000s

2010s

2020s

Multiple nominations and wins

Developers and publishers 
Sony has published the most nominees and the most winners and is the only publisher with back-to-back winners. Sony's developer Naughty Dog has developed the most nominees and is tied with Bethesda Game Studios for developing the most winners. Ubisoft Montreal and Valve are tied for developing the most nominees without developing a single winner. Annapurna Interactive has published the most nominees without having published a single winner.

Franchises 
Only six franchises have been nominated more than once, and there hasn't been a franchise to win more than once so far. Uncharted has been the most nominated franchise.

Notes

References 

D.I.C.E. Awards
Awards established in 2009